Diospyros chloroxylon, the green ebony persimmon, is a wild fruit-bearing plant in the family Ebenaceae. It is the indigenous fruit of the Indian subcontinent, and both unripe and ripe fruits are eaten by tribal people.

References

chloroxylon